A general-purpose machine gun (GPMG) is an air-cooled, usually belt-fed machine gun that can be adapted flexibly to various tactical roles for light and medium machine guns. A GPMG typically features a quick-change barrel design calibered for various fully powered cartridges such as the 7.62×51mm NATO, 7.62×54mmR, 7.5×54mm French, 7.5×55mm Swiss and 7.92×57mm Mauser, and be configured for mounting to different stabilizing platforms from bipods and tripods to vehicles, aircraft, boats and fortifications, usually as an infantry support weapon or squad automatic weapon.

History
The general-purpose machine gun (GPMG) originated with the MG 34, designed in 1934 by Heinrich Vollmer of Mauser on the commission of Nazi Germany to circumvent the restrictions on machine guns imposed by the Treaty of Versailles. It was introduced into the Wehrmacht as an entirely new concept in automatic firepower, dubbed the Einheitsmaschinengewehr, meaning "universal machine gun" in German. In itself the MG 34 was an excellent weapon for its time: an air-cooled, recoil-operated machine gun that could run through belts of 7.92×57mm Mauser ammunition at a rate of 850 rounds per minute, with lethality at ranges of more than 1,000 meters. The main feature of the MG 34 is that simply by changing its mount, sights and feed mechanism, the operator could radically transform its function: on its standard bipod it was a light machine gun ideal for infantry assaults; on a tripod it could serve as a sustained-fire medium machine gun; mounting on aircraft or vehicles turned it into an air defence weapon, and it also served as the coaxial machine gun on numerous German tanks.

During World War II, the MG 34 was supplemented by a new GPMG, the MG 42, although it remained in combat use. The MG 42 was more efficient to manufacture, and more robust, as well as having an extremely high cyclic rate of fire of 1,200 to 1,500 rounds per minute. One of the Einheits Maschinengewehr GPMG roles was to provide low level anti-aircraft coverage. A high cyclic rate of fire is advantageous for use against targets typically exposed to fire for a limited time span, like aircraft or targets minimizing their exposure by quickly moving from cover to cover. It was nicknamed "Hitler's buzzsaw" by Allied troops, and alongside the MG 34 it inflicted heavy casualties on Allied soldiers on all European and North African fronts of World War II.  Following the war the victorious Allied nations took an interest in the MG 34 and MG 42, influencing many post-war general-purpose machine guns, many still in use today. They lent design elements to the Belgian FN MAG and the American M60, while spawning the Zastava M53, Swiss M51, and Austrian MG 74. The MG 42's qualities of firepower and usability meant that it became the foundation of an entire series of postwar machine guns, including the MG 1 and MG 3 - the latter, is still in production.

Post-WWII examples

 German Rheinmetall MG 3, a direct descendant of the MG 42, still in service with the German Army and others and widely exported.
 German Heckler & Koch HK21, is based on the Heckler & Koch G3 rifle and widely exported.
 German Heckler & Koch MG5, the new standard machine gun of the German Army.
 Italian MG 42/59, a direct descendant of the MG 42 and a licensed MG 3 variant, is still in service with the Italian military
 Belgian FN MAG, which copied the MG 42's feed-system and trigger-mechanism. It is the most widely used GPMG among western armies.
 Belgian/American Mk 48, is a GPMG based on the FN Minimi light machine gun and M249 SAW.
American M60, which is based on the German FG 42 and uses the MG 42's feed system and stamp-steel construction. 
 American M240, itself an FN MAG variant. It replaced the M60 in U.S. service.
 French MAS AA-52, which more or less copies the MG 42 feed-system. It has been largely phased out in favour of the FN MAG and FN Minimi.
 Czechoslovakian Uk vz. 59, is based on the Vz. 52 and Vz.52/57, and originating with ZB vz. 26 and Bren gun designs.
 Russian PK/PKM, family of multi-purpose machine guns, is based on the AKM assault rifle featuring stamped receivers, widely exported.
 Russian AEK-999, is an improved version of the PK/PKM.
 Russian Pecheneg, is a variant of the PK/PKM with a fixed barrel and cooling jacket. 
 Yugoslav Zastava M84, is a direct copy of the Russian PK machine-gun.
 Polish UKM-2000, is based on the Russian PK machine-gun.
 People's Republic of China Type 80, is based on the Russian PK machine-gun.
 People's Republic of China Type 67, and later improved models.
 People's Republic of China Type 88 Machine Gun
 People's Republic of China QJY-201
 Japanese Sumitomo NTK-62, is a GPMG based on the FN MAG.
 South African Vektor SS-77, is based on the Russian PK/PKM.
 South African Denel DMG-5, is based on the Vektor SS-77 and Russian PK/PKM.
 South Korean S&T Motiv K12, is based on the K3 light machine gun.
 Swiss MG 51, a direct descendant of the MG42.
 Swiss SIG MG 710-3
 Swiss SIG MG 50
 Austrian MG 74, a direct descendant of the MG 42/59 and since 1974 the standard machine gun of the Austrian Armed Forces.
 Israeli IWI Negev NG-7, is a GPMG based on the IWI Negev light machine gun.
 Canadian C6A1 FLEX, an improved version of C6 that is a Canadian version of FN MAG.
 Belgian FN EVOLYS, is a multi-caliber, 3D printing and polymers material lightweight machine gun.

Gallery

See also
 Light machine gun
 Heavy machine gun
 Squad automatic weapon
 List of firearms
 Fully powered cartridge

References 

Machine guns